Daniel Hall was Speaker of the Wisconsin State Assembly.

Biography
Hall was born on November 20, 1819, in Greenwich, New York. He graduated from Union College in 1845.

Career
Hall was District Attorney of Jefferson County, Wisconsin from 1857 to 1858. After serving as a member of the Wisconsin State Assembly during the 1870 and 1871 sessions, he was chosen as Speaker for the 1872 session. He was elected to the 1872 session as an Independent, but continued serving as a Republican.

References

People from Greenwich (town), New York
Politicians from Watertown, Wisconsin
District attorneys in Wisconsin
Wisconsin Independents
Union College (New York) alumni
1819 births
Year of death missing
Speakers of the Wisconsin State Assembly
Republican Party members of the Wisconsin State Assembly